is a manga by Osamu Tezuka that began serialization in 1962.

Plot
In the wilderness of Hokkaido, the Ainu people of Japan live in harmony with nature.  Kotan Nakamura is a young Ainu boy living peacefully until he meets a tiger one day.  This tiger, Dan, has escaped from a train that was carrying him to a zoo.  Together, they discover mysterious ruins hidden underneath the ground.

Within the ruins, Kotan and Dan discover an old man named Upopo living there.  He tells the boy and the tiger about three keys to a fantastic treasure.  As it so happens, the evil Sekkoku Kou is also searching for the treasure and shoots Upopo.  Before he dies, Upopo gives one of the keys to Kotan.

Now, Kotan and Dan find themselves involved in an ugly battle as numerous villains track them down to try to get the three keys so they can claim the treasure.

Characters
Kotan Nakamura: An ainu boy who befriends an escaped tiger with whom he goes on adventures with.
Dan: A tiger that has escaped from a train carrying him to a zoo.
Upopo: A mysterious old man living in a hidden, underground ruin who knows the secret to finding a great treasure.
Sekkoku Kou: A villain who wants to obtain the three keys that will unlock a great treasure.
Doctor Zoger:
Doctor Hanamaru as himself:
Tamayo:

See also
List of Osamu Tezuka manga
Osamu Tezuka
Osamu Tezuka's Star System

References

External links
"Brave Dan" manga page at TezukaOsamu@World 
"Brave Dan" manga page at TezukaOsamu@World 
"Brave Dan" manga publications page at TezukaOsamu@World 
"Brave Dan" manga publications page at TezukaOsamu@World 

Osamu Tezuka manga
1962 manga
Shogakukan manga
Digital Manga Publishing titles
Shōnen manga